Louis Emil Denfeld (April 13, 1891 – March 28, 1972) was an admiral in the United States Navy who served as Chief of Naval Operations from December 15, 1947 to November 1, 1949. He also held several significant surface commands during World War II, and after the war he served as the dual-hatted commander of United States Pacific Command and Pacific Fleet.

Life and naval career
Born in Westborough, Massachusetts, Denfeld graduated from the United States Naval Academy in 1912. He took command of the destroyer  in 1919 and served aboard the submarine  during 1923 and 1924. He commanded Destroyer Division 11 from 1935 to 1937.

Denfeld was selected to be aide to the Chief of Naval Operations in 1939, then commanded first Destroyer Division 18, then Destroyer Squadron 1 from 1939 to 1941. He served as Chief of Staff to the Commander of the United States Atlantic Fleet, Admiral Royal E. Ingersoll. For planning of safe routes for escort convoys in this capacity, Denfeld received the Legion of Merit. He became head of the Atlantic Fleet Support Force in 1941, then assistant chief to the Bureau of Navigation in 1942. He led Battleship Division 9 in 1945, was appointed Chief of the Bureau of Personnel in 1945, and commanded United States Pacific Command and Pacific Fleet in 1947.

On February 28, 1947 Denfeld was named Military Governor of the Marshall Islands, Caroline Islands, and Mariana Islands, replacing Admiral John H. Towers. Denfeld was appointed Chief of Naval Operations on December 15, 1947. Due to his role in the "Revolt of the Admirals", he was detached from duty by the Secretary of the Navy Francis P. Matthews on November 1, 1949, and retired in 1950.

Denfeld was a candidate for Governor of Massachusetts in 1950. He lost the Republican nomination to Arthur W. Coolidge. Denfield died in Westborough, Massachusetts at the age of 80. He is buried at Arlington National Cemetery.  Denfeld Avenue in Kensington, Maryland, is named for him.

Awards and decorations
Admiral Louis E. Denfeld received many decorations during his career. Here is his ribbon bar:

References

External links

 

1891 births
1972 deaths
People from Westborough, Massachusetts
Military personnel from Massachusetts
Chiefs of Naval Operations
United States Navy admirals
United States submarine commanders
United States military governors
United States Navy personnel of World War I
United States Navy World War II admirals
United States Naval Academy alumni
Massachusetts Republicans
High Commissioners of the Trust Territory of the Pacific Islands
Recipients of the Navy Distinguished Service Medal
Recipients of the Legion of Merit
Burials at Arlington National Cemetery
20th-century American politicians